Huayrapongo (possibly from Quechua  wayra wind, punku door) also known as Ventanillas de la Playa El Tambo, is an archaeological site in Peru. It is situated in the Cajamarca Region, San Miguel Province, Llapa District. The site lies on the mountain Huayrapongo.

References 

Archaeological sites in Peru
Archaeological sites in Cajamarca Region
Mountains of Cajamarca Region